ONE Male Condom is a condom intended for use during anal sex. It received US Food and Drug Administration (FDA) approval on February 23, 2022. All previously approved condoms were only approved for vaginal sex, and had a high failure rate when used off-label for anal sex, both homosexual and heterosexual, increasing the risk of contracting sexually transmitted infections such as HIV.
 It was originally reported that ONE Condoms designed a condom specifically for anal sex. ONE Condoms and MyONE fitted condoms have long been on the market, but in February 2022 received FDA clearance to modify their intended use statement to include anal sex. Condoms have only previously been approved for vaginal sex.
 ONE Condoms issued a press release noting: "Our brand is ONE Condoms, not "One Male Condom." FDA still uses "male condom" as a term, and listed us as "One Male Condom" in their press release. As a brand, we like to use "external condom" instead to be inclusive. Our mission is to be a brand for everyONE."
 ONE and MyONE Condom brands are owned and distributed by Global Protection Corp., a part of the Karex group, the world's largest condom manufacturer.

Availability 
MyONE Custom Fit condoms are available at CVS stores nationwide. The sizes available nationwide at CVS were selected based on popularity and represent sizes not otherwise found in-store. “Because we couldn’t take over the entire CVS condom section with 52 sizes, we worked with CVS to choose three of our most popular sizes that would help them better serve their customers,” said Davin Wedel, MyONE®’s founder and president.

ONE Condoms with the FDA anal sex indication are available at Walmart stores in the US. The FDA's approval for an anal sex indication inspired ONE and Walmart to partner with each other on new packaging that highlights the FDA clearance for safer anal sex. The result is the ONE Backdoor Pack, a new three-pack available exclusively at Walmart stores nationwide in the U.S.

Efficacy 
A clinical trial to determine the safety and efficacy of One Male Condom studied 252 men who have sex with men and 252 men who have sex with women. All subjects were 18 to 54 years old.  

The study found that the total condom failure rate was 0.68% for anal intercourse and 1.89% for vaginal intercourse with the One Male Condom. Condom failure rate was defined as the number of slippage, breakage or both slippage and breakage events that occurred over the total number of sex acts performed. For the One Male Condom, the overall percentage of adverse events was 1.92%. Adverse events reported during the clinical trial included symptomatic STI or recent STI diagnosis (0.64%), condom or lubricant-related discomfort (0.85%), partner discomfort with lubricant (0.21%) and partner urinary tract infection (0.21%). The symptomatic STI or recent STI diagnoses observed in the study were self-reported and may be the result of subjects having intercourse without a condom or may have preceded use of the One Male Condom, as STIs were not measured at baseline."

References

Condoms
Prevention of HIV/AIDS